Arnside and Silverdale is an Area of Outstanding Natural Beauty in England, on the border between Lancashire and Cumbria, adjoining Morecambe Bay. One of the smallest AONBs, it covers 29 square miles (75 km2) between the Kent Estuary, the River Keer and the A6 road. It was designated in 1972.

Description
The area is characterised by low hills of Carboniferous Limestone, including Arnside Knott (522 feet) and Warton Crag (535 feet), interspersed with grassland. Much of the area is covered by deciduous woodland, in which ash, oak, and hazel predominate. The coastal area contains large extents of salt marsh, although these are under threat from the shifting channel of the Kent Estuary. 

The Leighton Moss nature reserve, owned by the RSPB, is the largest area of reedbeds in North West England, and is an Important Bird Area. The bittern, one of the resident species, has been adopted as the logo of the AONB. In addition, there are fifteen SSSIs in the area; one of these, Gait Barrows National Nature Reserve, is home to some rare species of butterfly including the high brown fritillary.

Arnside and Silverdale are the main villages in the area. Other settlements include Warton, Yealand Redmayne, Beetham and Storth.

Landscape Trust
The AONB is supported by the Landscape Trust, a registered charity with over 1000 members. Its activities include ownership and management of several nature reserves and the production of a journal Keer to Kent.

References

External links

Walks around Arnside & Silverdale 
 Arnside Online

 

Areas of Outstanding Natural Beauty in England
Protected areas established in 1972
Protected areas of Cumbria
Protected areas of Lancashire
Arnside